, abbreviated , also simply known as the Japanese navy, is the maritime warfare branch of the Japan Self-Defense Forces, tasked with the naval defense of Japan. The JMSDF was formed following the dissolution of the Imperial Japanese Navy (IJN) after World War II. The JMSDF has a fleet of 154 ships, 346 aircraft and 50,800 personnel.

History

Origin

Following Japan's defeat in World War II, the Imperial Japanese Navy was dissolved by the Potsdam Declaration acceptance. Ships were disarmed, and some of them, such as the battleship , were taken by the Allied Powers as reparation. The remaining ships were used for repatriation of the Japanese soldiers from abroad and also for minesweeping in the area around Japan, initially under the control of the Second Bureau of the Demobilization Ministry. The minesweeping fleet was eventually transferred to the newly formed Maritime Safety Agency, which helped maintain the resources and expertise of the navy.

Japan's 1947 Constitution was drawn up after the conclusion of the war, Article 9 specifying that "The Japanese people forever renounce war as a sovereign right of the nation and the threat or use of force as a means of settling international disputes." The prevalent view in Japan is that this article allows for military forces to be kept for the purposes of self-defense. Due to Cold War pressures, the United States was also happy for Japan to provide part of its own defense, rather than have it fully rely on American forces.

In 1952, the Safety Security Force was formed within the Maritime Safety Agency, incorporating the minesweeping fleet and other military vessels, mainly destroyers, given by the United States. In 1954, the SSF was separated, and the JMSDF was formally created as the naval branch of the Japan Self-Defense Forces (JSDF), following the passage of the 1954 Self-Defense Forces Law.

The first ships in the JMSDF were former U.S. Navy destroyers, transferred to Japanese control in 1954. In 1956, the JMSDF received its first domestically produced destroyer since World War II, Harukaze. Due to the Cold War threat posed by the Soviet Navy's sizable and powerful submarine fleet, the JMSDF was primarily tasked with an anti-submarine role.

Post-Cold War
Following the end of the Cold War, the role of the JMSDF has vastly changed. In 1991, after much international pressure, the JMSDF dispatched four minesweepers, a fleet oiler (JDS Tokiwa) and a minesweeping tender (JDS Hayase) to the Persian Gulf in the aftermath of the Gulf War, under the name of Operation Gulf Dawn, to clear mines sown by Saddam Hussein's defending forces. Starting with a mission to Cambodia in 1993 when JSDF personnel were supported by JDS Towada, it has been active in a number of UN-led peacekeeping operations throughout Asia.

In 1993, it commissioned its first Aegis-equipped destroyer, . It has also been active in joint naval exercises with other countries, such as the United States. The JMSDF has dispatched a number of its destroyers on a rotating schedule to the Indian Ocean in an escort role for allied vessels as part of the UN-led Operation Enduring Freedom.

21st century

The JMSDF, along with the Japan Coast Guard, has also been active in preventing North Korean infiltrators from reaching Japan and on 22 December 2001, engaged and sank a North Korean spy ship in the Battle of Amami-Ōshima.

In 2002, the JMSDF deployed ships to the Arabian Sea in support of Operation Anaconda during the War in Afghanistan.

Due to the size and features of the ship, including a full-length flight deck, it was classified as a helicopter carrier by Lloyd's Register — similar to the United Kingdom's . There was discussion about whether an aircraft carrier would be prohibited by Article 9 of the Japanese Constitution, since aircraft carriers are generally considered offensive weapons. In April 1988, the former chief of the Defense Agency, Tsutomu Kawara, said, "The Self-Defense Forces are not allowed to possess ICBMs (intercontinental ballistic missiles), strategic bombers, or attack aircraft carriers."

Historically (until about 1975 in the U.S. Navy) large-scale carriers were classified as "attack aircraft carriers" and the smaller carriers as "anti-submarine aircraft carriers". Since helicopter carriers have little built-in attack capability and they primarily fulfill defensive roles such as anti-submarine warfare, the Japanese government argues that the prohibition does not extend to helicopter carriers.

With an increase in tensions with North Korea following the 1993 test of the Nodong-1 missile and the 1998 test of the Taepodong-1 missile over northern Japan, the JMSDF has stepped up its role in air defense. A ship-based anti-ballistic missile system was successfully test-fired on 18 December 2007 and has been installed on Japan's Aegis-equipped destroyers.

The first one of these ships was laid down in 2012 and was launched on 6 August 2013.

The submarine fleet of the JMSDF consists of some of the most technologically advanced diesel-electric submarines in the world. This is due to careful defense planning in which the submarines are routinely retired from service ahead of schedule and replaced by more advanced models. In 2010 it was announced that the Japanese submarine fleet would be increased in size for the first time in 36 years.

After a meeting between the Japanese Foreign Minister and U.S. Ambassador to Japan on 4 March 2014, the Japanese Defense Ministry and U.S. Department of Defense announced they would hold studies for the joint development of the littoral vessel under the bilateral Mutual Defense Assistance Agreement. The vessel is planned to be a high-speed trimaran designed for operations in shallow coastal waters capable of carrying helicopters, possibly a lighter variant of the American  littoral combat ship.

The study is in response to the growth of the Chinese People's Liberation Army Navy and budgetary issues with the U.S. military that may affect their ability to operate in the Pacific. The J-LCS would be used to intervene during Chinese ship incursions near the Senkaku Islands and other contested areas in the East China Sea, and possibly counter similar Chinese vessels like the Type 056 corvette and Type 022 missile boat. A  J-LCS with an enlarged hull could operate the SH-60K anti-submarine helicopter or the MCH-101 airborne mine countermeasures (AMCM) helicopter.

On May 1, 2017,  was dispatched to protect a U.S. Navy supply vessel in the Pacific. This was the first time the JMSDF has been used to defend allied vessels since the 2016 amendment to the Japanese Constitution.

It is Japan's first submarine powered by lithium-ion batteries and was developed by Mitsubishi Heavy Industries. The Japan Maritime Self-Defense Force will utilize it by March 2020.

Japan and the United States conducted the biggest military exercise around Japan thus far in the biennial Keen Sword from 29 October to 2 November 2018. It included a total of 57,000 sailors, marines and airmen. 47,000 service members were from the JSDF and 10,000 from the U.S. Armed Forces. A naval supply ship and a frigate of the Royal Canadian Navy also participated. There were simulations of air combat, ballistic missile defense and amphibious landings.

On 18 December 2018, Japan announced it will refit the Izumo-class destroyers to carry US-designed F-35B fighter jets. This makes them de facto aircraft carriers. To avoid controversy, the ruling parties call it a "multi-purpose operation destroyer". It would be the first such ship in the JMSDF since World War II.

On 23 May 2019, retired MSDF vice-admiral Toshiyuki Ito stated that Japan requires at least four Izumo-class destroyers to be viable for real naval combat operations. He said "If you only have two vessels, you can only use them for training personnel for taking off and landing operations, so this plan doesn't make sense for MSDF officers, frankly speaking." As aircraft carriers, the Izumo-class destroyers are relatively small. Each ship can only carry approximately 10 F-35Bs. That is too few aircraft for effective air defense of a naval fleet.

The Diet of Japan approved in 2019 the order of 42 STOVL Lockheed Martin F-35 Lightning II aircraft in addition to 135 F-35A model conventional takeoff and landing fighters for the Japanese Air Self Defense Force to operate from their land bases; the F-35B is same model aircraft that the US Marines operate from US Navy aircraft carriers and amphibious assault ships, the US Marines also plan to fly from the Japanese Izumo class after the STOVL modifications and refit.

On October 14, 2020, the 3,000-ton submarine  was unveiled. This is the first vessel of the Taigei class and the 22nd submarine vessel of the JMSDF. It will enter service in March 2022.

On 30 June 2022, the Japan Ministry of Defense announced the construction of 12 offshore patrol vessels (OPVs) by Japan Marine United Corporation (JMU) for the Japanese Maritime Self-Defense Force (JMSDF) at a cost of ¥ 9 billion (US$66 million) per ship.  The purpose of this OPV program is to provide enhanced maritime security, particularly around the southwestern Ryukyu Islands, including the disputed Senkaku/Diaoyu Islands in the East China Sea, by boosting JMSDF patrol activities in the region. These vessels are highly automated and configurable to meet a wide range of missions involving "enhanced steady-state intelligence, surveillance, and reconnaissance (ISR) in the waters around Japan". Under the contract, JMU is charged with delivering the 12 vessels to the JMSDF from fiscal year 2023, which starts on April 1, 2023.

On August 31, 2022, the Japan Ministry of Defense announced that JMSDF will operate two "Aegis system equipped ships" (イージス・システム搭載艦 in Japanese) to replace the earlier plan of Aegis Ashore installations, commissioning one by the end of fiscal year 2027, and the other by the end of FY2028. The budget for design and other related expenses are to be submitted in the form of “item requests”, without specific amounts, and the initial procurement of the lead items are expected to clear legislation by FY2023. Construction is to begin in the following year of FY2024. At 20,000 tons each, both vessels will be the largest surface combatant warships operated by the JMSDF, and according to Popular Mechanics, they will "arguably [be] the largest deployable surface warships in the world".

On 16 November 2022, the guided-missile destroyer  fired an SM-3 Block IIA missile, successfully intercepting the target outside the atmosphere in the first launch of the missile from a Japanese warship. On 18 November 2022, the  likewise fired an SM-3 Block IB missile with a successful hit outside the atmosphere. Both test firings were conducted at the Pacific Missile Range Facility on Kauai Island, Hawaii, in cooperation with the U.S. Navy and U.S. Missile Defense Agency. This was the first time the two ships conducted SM-3 firings in the same time period, and the tests validated the ballistic missile defense capabilities of Japan's newest s.

On 16 December 2022, the Japanese Cabinet approved a trio of defense-related policy documents, including its new National Security Strategy (NSS or 国家安全保障戦略), the strategic guideline document for the Japanese government's policies regarding diplomacy, defense, and economic security for the next decade. Based on the NSS, the National Defense Strategy (国家防衛戦略) outlined Japan's defense policy goals and the means to achieve them while the Defense Buildup Program (防衛力整備計画) outlined the scale of the introduction of specific defense equipment within the budgetary objectives. According to the Defense Buildup Program, the Japan Maritime Self-Defense Force (JMSDF) will increase the number of Aegis-equipped guided-missile destroyers (DDG) from the current eight to ten, as well as two Aegis system-equipped vessels (ASEV) to be deployed in ballistic missile defense (BMD) operations. By the end of the decade, the JMSDF will operate 12 ships equipped with Aegis Weapon System (AWS) and likewise plans to replace its fleet of older, less capable destroyers and destroyer escorts with s.

Capabilities 

The JMSDF has an official strength of 50,000 personnel, but presently numbers around 50,800 active personnel.

As a result of continuing effective defense investment due to Japan's economic development and an end to the Cold War, the JMSDF became the world's fourth largest navy by total tonnage by 2000. Japan has the eighth largest Exclusive Economic Zone (EEZ) in the world, and the JMSDF is responsible for protecting this large area. As an island nation, dependent on maritime trade for the majority of its resources, including food and raw materials, maritime operations are a very important aspect of Japanese defense policy.

The JMSDF is known in particular for its anti-submarine warfare and minesweeping capabilities. Defense planners believe the most effective approach to combating hostile submarines entails mobilizing all available weapons, including surface combatants, submarines, patrol planes, and helicopters. They are also known to operate at least fourteen listening stations all over the country that have ELINT and marine surveillance radar warning systems.

Historically, the Japan Air Self-Defense Force (JASDF) has been relied on to provide air cover at sea, a role that is subordinate to the JASDF's primary mission of air defense of the home islands. Extended patrols over sea lanes are beyond the JASDF's current capabilities.

The Japanese fleet's capacity to provide ship-based antiaircraft warfare protection is limited by the absence of aircraft carriers, though its destroyers and frigates equipped with the Aegis combat system provide a formidable capability in antiaircraft and antimissile warfare. These capabilities are force multipliers, allowing force projection of Japan's sizable destroyer and frigate force far from home waters, and acquiring them is contentious considering Japan's "passive" defense policy.

Activities

International activities

Mission in the Indian Ocean

Destroyers and combat support ships of Japan Maritime Self-Defense Force were dispatched to the Indian Ocean from 2001 to 2008 to participate in OEF-MIO (Operation Enduring Freedom-Maritime Interdiction Operation). Their mission is to prevent the marine transportation of illegal weapons and ammunition, and the drugs which fund terrorist activity. Since 2004, the JMSDF has provided ships of foreign forces with fuel for their ships and ship-based helicopters, as well as freshwater.

This was the third time Japanese military vessels had been dispatched overseas since World War II, following the deployments of mine-sweeping units during the Korean War and the Persian Gulf War. The law enabling the mission expired on 2 November 2007, and the operation was temporarily canceled due to a veto of a new bill authorizing the mission by the opposition-controlled upper chamber of the Japanese Diet.

In January 2010, the defense minister ordered the JMSDF to return from the Indian Ocean, fulfilling a government pledge to end the eight-year refueling mission. Prime Minister Yukio Hatoyama refused to renew the law authorizing the mission, ignoring requests from the American government for continuation. Both the Western alliance country typified by the Royal Australian Navy and the Royal Danish Navy, doing friendship activities in the Indian Ocean.

Mission in Somalia

In May 2010, Japan announced its intention to build a permanent naval base in Djibouti, from which it will conduct operations to protect merchant shipping from Somali pirates.

Military exercises and exchanges

The JMSDF and the U.S. Navy frequently carry out joint exercises and "U.S. Navy officials have claimed that they have a closer daily relationship with the JMSDF than any other navy in the world". The JMSDF participates in RIMPAC, the annual multi-national military exercise near Hawaii that has been hosted by the U.S. Navy since 1980. The JMSDF dispatched a ship to the Russian Vladivostok harbor in July 1996 to participate in the Russian Navy's 300th Anniversary Naval Review. The JMSDF has also conducted joint naval exercises with the Indian Navy.

RIMPAC: Japan Maritime Self-Defense Force participated in RIMPAC after 1980.
Pacific Shield (PSI): The Japan Maritime Self-Defense Force has participated in Pacific Shield after 2004; and in 2007, the Japan Maritime Self-Defense Force hosted the exercise.
Pacific Reach: The Japan Maritime Self-Defense Force has participated in the bi-annual submarine rescue exercise since 2000. In 2002, the Japan Maritime Self-Defense Force hosted the exercise.
Navy to Navy Talks: The Japan Maritime Self-Defense Force holds regular naval conferences with its counterparts of Indonesia, Malaysia, Australia, the United Kingdom, and the United States of America.
AEGIS Ballistic Missile Defense FTM: The Japan Maritime Self-Defense Force has participated in the FTM after FTM-10. The Japan Maritime Self-Defense Force carried out JFTM-1 in December 2007.
 The Japan Maritime Self-Defense Force participates in the United States Navy's Personnel Exchange Program (PEP) in which officers and enlisted personnel from each country serve fully integrated into the other country's navy for two years.
 Keen Sword is the biggest biennial military exercise around Japan. The participants are primarily Japan and the United States.

Equipment

Ships and submarines

The ship prefix JDS (Japanese Defense Ship) was used until 2008, at which time JMSDF ships started using the prefix JS (Japanese Ship) to reflect the upgrade of the Japanese Defense Agency to the Ministry of Defense. , the JMSDF operates a total of 124 ships (excluding minor auxiliary vessels), including: two multi-purpose operation destroyers (de facto aircraft carriers), two helicopter carriers (called helicopter destroyers), 26 destroyers, 10 small destroyers (or frigates), six destroyer escorts (or corvettes), 22 attack submarines, 29 mine countermeasure vessels, six patrol vessels, three landing ship tanks, eight training vessels and a fleet of various auxiliary ships. The fleet has a total displacement of approximately 624,000 tonnes (excluding auxiliary vessels).

Aircraft

The Japan Maritime Self-Defense Force aviation maintains a large naval air force, including 201 fixed-wing aircraft and 145 helicopters. Most of these aircraft are used in anti-submarine warfare operations.

Aircraft

Organization, formations and structure

The JMSDF is commanded by the Chief of the Maritime Staff. Its structure consists of the Maritime Staff Office, the Self Defense Fleet, five regional district commands, the air-training squadron and various support units, such as hospitals and schools. The Maritime Staff Office, located in Tokyo, serves the Chief of Staff in commanding and supervising the force.

The Self-Defense Fleet, headquartered at Yokosuka, consists of the JMSDF's military shipping. It is composed of Fleet Escort Force (based in Yokosuka, Sasebo, Maizuru and Kure), the Fleet Air Force headquartered at Atsugi, Fleet Submarine Force based at Yokosuka and Kure, Mine Warfare Force based at Yokosuka and the Fleet Training Command at Yokosuka.

On 6 March 2018, Ryoko Azuma became the first female squadron commander in the JMSDF. Her unit includes the flagship Izumo, the largest warship in the JMSDF. She commands four warships making up a division with a total of 1,000 crew members.

Each Escort Flotilla is formed as a fleet of eight destroyers and eight on-board helicopters. Each force is composed of one helicopter destroyer (DDH) acting as a command ship, two guided-missile destroyers (DDG) and five standard or ASW destroyers (DD). The JMSDF is planning to reorganize the respective Escort Flotillas into a DDH group and DDG group, enabling faster overseas deployments.

Prime Minister of Japan
Minister of Defense
JMSDF Chief of Staff / Maritime Staff Office
Self-Defense Fleet
Fleet Escort Force
Escort Flotilla 1 (Yokosuka)
Escort Squadron 1: DDH-183 Izumo; DDG-179 Maya; DD-101 Murasame; DD-107 Ikazuchi (Yokosuka)
Escort Squadron 5: DDG-173 Kongō; DD-108 Akebono; DD-109 Ariake; DD-115 Akizuki (Sasebo)
Escort Flotilla 2 (Sasebo)
Escort Squadron 2: DDH-182 Ise; DDG-178 Ashigara; DD-102 Harusame; DD-119 Asahi (Sasebo)
Escort Squadron 6: DDG-174 Kirishima; DD-110 Takanami; DD-111 Onami; DD-116 Teruzuki (Yokosuka)
Escort Flotilla 3 (Maizuru)
Escort Squadron 3: DDH-181 Hyūga; DDG-175 Myōkō; DDG-177 Atago; DD-118 Fuyuzuki (Maizuru)
Escort Squadron 7: DD-103 Yudachi; DD-112 Makinami; DD-114 Suzunami; DD-120 Shiranui (Ominato)
Escort Flotilla 4 (Kure)
Escort Squadron 4: DDH-184 Kaga; DD-105 Inazuma; DD-106 Samidare; DD-113 Sazanami (Kure)
Escort Squadron 8: DDG-180 Haguro; DDG-176 Chōkai; DD-104 Kirisame; DD-117 Suzutsuki (Sasebo)
Naval District Forces:
11th Escort Squadron: DD-152 Yamagiri; DD-153 Yūgiri; DD-154 Amagiri (Yokosuka)
12th Escort Squadron: DD-158 Umigiri; DE-229 Abukuma; DE-234 Tone (Kure)
13th Escort Squadron: DD-157 Sawagiri; DE-230 Jintsū; FFM-3 Noshiro (Sasebo)
14th Escort Squadron: DD-151 Asagiri; DE-232 Sendai;  DD-156 Setogiri (Maizuru)
15th Escort Squadron: DD-155 Hamagiri; DE-231 Ōyodo; DE-233 Chikuma (Ominato)
1st Replenishment-at-Sea Squadron (Yokosuka): AOE-422 Towada (Kure); AOE-423 Tokiwa (Yokosuka); AOE-424 Hamana (Sasebo); AOE-425 Mashu (Mashu-class) (Maizuru); AOE-426 Omi (Mashu-class) (Sasebo)
1st Training Support Squadron: ATS-4202 Kurobe; ATS-4203 Tenryu; (Kure)
Fleet Training Command (Yokosuka)
Fleet Air Force
Fleet Air Wing 1 (P-3C UH-60J)
Fleet Air Wing 2 (P-3C UH-60J)
Fleet Air Wing 4 (P-3C UH-60J)
Fleet Air Wing 5 (P-3C UH-60J)
Fleet Air Wing 21 (SH-60J/K)
Fleet Air Wing 22 (SH-60J)
Fleet Air Wing 31 (US-1A US-2 EP-3 OP-3C UP-3D LC-90 U-36A)
Fleet Squadron 51 (P-1, P-3C UP-3C/D OP-3 SH-60J/K OH-6DA)
Fleet Squadron 61 (C-130R LC-90)
Mine Countermeasures Helicopter Squadron 111 (MCH-101)
Fleet Submarine Force (Yokosuka)
Submarine Flotilla 1 (Kure)
Flotilla HQ: ASR-403 Chihaya
Submarine Squadron 1: SS-507 Jinryū; SS-510 Shōryū; SS-593 Makishio; SS-594 Isoshio
Submarine Squadron 3: SS-504 Kenryū; SS-511 Ōryū; SS-596 Kuroshio; SS-600 Mochishio
Submarine Squadron 5: SS-501 Sōryū; SS-502 Unryū; SS-503 Hakuryū; SS-508 Sekiryū
Kure Submarine Base Support Squadron
Submarine Flotilla 2 (Yokosuka)
Flotilla HQ: ASR-404 Chiyoda
Submarine Squadron 2: SS-592 Uzushio; SS-595 Narushio; SS-597 Takashio
Submarine Squadron 4: SS-505 Zuiryū; SS-598 Yaeshio; SS-599 Setoshio
Submarine Squadron 6: SS-506 Kokuryū; SS-509 Seiryū; SS-512 Tōryū
Yokosuka Submarine Base Support Squadron
1st Submarine Training Squadron (Kure): TSS-3608 Oyashio; TSS-3609 Michishio
Submarine Training Command (Kure)
Yokosuka Submarine Training Detachment
Mine Warfare Force (Yokosuka)
Minesweeper Squadron 1 (Yokosuka): MST-463 Uraga (Uraga class mine warfare command ship); MSO-304 Awaji (Awaji-class minesweeper); MSO-305 Hirado (Awaji-class minesweeper); MSC-606 Hatsushima (Enoshima-class minesweeper)
Minesweeper Squadron 2 (Sasebo): MSC-601 Hirashima; MSC-602 Yakushima; MSC-603 Takashima (all three Hirashima-class minesweepers)
Minesweeper Squadron 3 (Kure): MST-464 Bungo (Uraga class mine warfare command ship); MSC-688 Aishima (Sugashima-class minesweeper); MSC-690 Miyajima (Sugashima-class minesweeper)
Minesweeper Squadron 101 (Kure): MSC-679 Yugeshima; MSC-680 Nagashima (both Uwajima-class minesweeper command boats); 4 minesweeping drone boats (SAM 1 - 4)
Landing Ship Squadron 1 (Kure): LST-4001 Ōsumi; LST-4002 Shimokita; LST-4003 Kunisaki
1st Landing Craft Air Cushion Unit (Kure): LCAC-2101 - 2106
Mine Warfare Support Center (Yokosuka)
Mine Warfare Support Detachment Kure
Fleet Research & Development Command
Fleet Intelligence Command
Oceanographic and ASW Support Command
Air Training Command
Shimofusa Air Training Group (P-3C YS-11TA UH-60J)
Tokushima Air Training Group (202nd Naval Air Training Squadron) (TC-90) (UC-90) (UH-60J)
Ozuki Air Training Group (T-5 UH-60J)
Maritime Material Command
Ship Supply Depot
Air Supply Depot
Training Division (Kure)
Division HQ: TV-3508 Kashima
Training Squadron 1: TV-3520 Hatakaze; TV-3521 Shimakaze
Communication Command
Criminal Investigation Command
Service Activity Tokyo
Printing Supply Unit
JMSDF Staff College
Maritime Officer Candidate School
1st Service School
2nd Service School
3rd Service School
4th Service School
Sub Area Activity Hanshin
Yokosuka District
Kure District
Sasebo District
Maizuru District
Ominato District

District Forces
Five district units act in concert with the fleet to guard the waters of their jurisdictions and provide shore-based support. Each district is home to a major JMSDF base and its supporting personnel and staff. Furthermore, each district is home to one or two regional escort squadrons, composed of two to three destroyers or destroyer escorts (DE). The destroyers tend to be of older classes, mainly former escort force ships. The destroyer escorts, on the other hand, tend to be purpose built vessels. Each district also has a number of minesweeping ships.

Fleet Air Force

The Fleet Air Force is tasked with patrol, ASW and rescue tasks. It is composed primarily of 7 aviation groups. Prominent bases are maintained at Kanoya, Hachinohe, Atsugi, Naha, Tateyama, Omura and Iwakuni. The Fleet Air Force is built up mainly with patrol aircraft such as the Lockheed P-3 Orion, rescue aircraft such as the US-1A and helicopters such as the SH-60J. In the JMSDF, helicopters deployed to each escort force are actually members of Fleet Air Force squadrons based on land.

Special Forces
Special Forces units consist of the following:

SBU (Special Boarding Unit)
MIT (Maritime Interception Team)

Ranks

Commissioned officer ranks
The rank insignia of commissioned officers.

Other ranks
The rank insignia of non-commissioned officers and enlisted personnel.

Culture and traditions

Music and traditions
The JMSDF has maintained some historic links with the Imperial Japanese Navy. Today's JMSDF continues to use the same martial songs, naval flags, signs, and technical terms as the IJN. The JMSDF still uses the Warship March, the old service march of the IJN, as its official service march. It also maintains the IJN bugle calls tradition, as every ship and shore establishment command maintain a platoon or squad of bugle players.

Flag and insignia
The Imperial Japanese Navy first adopted the off-set naval ensign  on May 15, 1870, and it was used until the end of World War II in 1945. On June 30, 1954, when the JSDF was established, the JSDF and JGSDF adopted a different rising sun flag with 8-rays and an 8:9 ratio. The old off-set navy flag with the sun and 16 rays was re-adopted as the ensign of the Maritime Self-Defense Force, but it was modified with a brighter red color. The original flag is darker red (RGB #b12d3d) while the post-WW2 version is brighter red (RGB #bd0029).

Food
Curry was brought to Japan from India by the Royal Navy. The Imperial Japanese Navy adopted curry to prevent beriberi. The recipe of Japanese curry was gradually arranged in Japan by chefs. It is also an excellent recipe, nutritious, easy to cook in mass quantity, and reportedly delicious.

The Japan Maritime Self-Defense Force continues this tradition with curry as the Friday menu. Japanese curry was changed and adapted drastically to become a uniquely Japanese dish.

Ship names
The ship prefix JDS (Japanese Defense Ship) was used until 2008, at which time JMSDF ships started using the prefix JS (Japanese Ship) to reflect the upgrade of the Japanese Defense Agency to the Ministry of Defense.

Ships of the JMSDF, known as Japan Ships (Ji'ei-Kan), are classified according to the following criteria:

Recruitment and training

JMSDF recruits receive three months of basic training followed by courses in patrol, gunnery, minesweeping, convoy operations, and maritime transportation. Flight students, all upper-secondary school graduates, enter a two-year course. Officer candidate schools offer six-month courses to qualified enlisted personnel and those who have completed flight school.

Graduates of four-year universities, the four-year National Defense Academy, and particularly outstanding enlisted personnel undergo a one-year officer course at the Officer Candidate School at Etajima (site of the former Imperial Naval Academy). The JMSDF also operates a staff college in Tokyo for senior officers.

The large volume of coastal commercial fishing and maritime traffic around Japan limits in-service sea training, especially in the relatively shallow waters required for mine laying, minesweeping, and submarine rescue practice. Training days are scheduled around slack fishing seasons in winter and summer—providing about ten days during the year.

The JMSDF maintains two oceangoing training ships and conducted annual long-distance on-the-job training for graduates of the one-year officer candidate school.

See also

Japanese ship naming conventions
Naval Computer and Telecommunications Station Yokosuka, Japan – US Navy facility key to MSDF/USN operational coordination.
Shipping Control Authority for the Japanese Merchant Marine – Post-WWII Occupation era organisation
Ships transferred from the United States Navy to the Japan Maritime Self-Defense Force [Category]

References

Further reading
Agawa, Naoyuki. Friendship across the Seas: The US Navy and the Japan Maritime Self-Defense Force. Tokyo: Japan Publishing Industry Foundation for Culture, 2019. 
Auer, James. The Postwar Rearmament of Japanese Maritime Forces, 1945–1971. New York: Praeger, 1973. 
Auer, James. "Japan's Changing Defense Policy," The New Pacific Security Environment. Ralph A. Cossa, ed. Wash. D.C.: National Defense University, 1993.
Jane's Intelligence Review, February 1992.
Jane's Defence Weekly 17 August 1991
Midford, Paul. "Japan's Response to Terror: Dispatching the SDF to the Arabian Sea," Asian Survey, 43:2 (March/April 2003).
Rubinstein, G.A. and J. O'Connell. "Japan's Maritime Self-Defense Forces," Naval Forces. 11: 2 (1990).
Sekino, Hideo. "Japan and Her Maritime Defense," U.S. Naval Institute Proceedings, (May 1971).
Sekino, Hideo. "A Diagnosis of our Maritime Self-Defense Force," Sekai no Kansen (Ships of the World), November 1970.
Takei, Tomohisa,"Japan Maritime Self Defense Force in the New Maritime Era," Hatou, 34: 4(November 2008).
Tsukigi, Shinji, "External and Internal Factors Shaping The Japan Maritime Self-Defense Force (JMSDF)." Monterey, Cal.: Naval Postgraduate School, June 1993. Master's thesis.
Wile, Ted Shannon. Sealane Defense: An Emerging Role for the JMSDF?. Master's Thesis, Naval Postgraduate School (1981).

Woolley, Peter J. Japan's Navy: Politics and Paradox 1971–2000. London: Lynne-Reinner: 2000. 
 Yamaguchi, Jiro. "The Gulf War and the Transformation of Japanese Constitutional Politics," Journal of Japanese Studies, Vol. 18 (Winter 1992).
 Young, P. Lewis. "The Japanese Maritime Self-Defense Forces: Major Surface Combatants Destroyers and Frigates," Asian Defense Journal (1985).

External links 

Yokosuka Naval Base Community Website JMSDF News
Japan Maritime Self-Defense Force News
JMSDF overview at GlobalSecurity
Introduction of a paper "JMSDF in the New Maritime Era"